Alice Vansittart Comyns Carr (née Strettell; 1850–1927), was a British costume designer whose work is associated with the Aesthetic dress movement.

Family
Alice Vansittart Strettell (referred to in succeeding sections as "Carr") was a daughter of Laura Vansittart Neale and the Reverend Alfred Baker Strettell, the British consular chaplain in Genoa, Italy, and subsequently the rector of St. Martin's Church in Canterbury. Her sister, Alma, was a writer and translator.

In 1873, Alice married J. Comyns Carr, a drama and art critic, author, playwright and director of the Grosvenor Gallery. They had three children: Philip, Dorothy, and Arthur, who became a Member of Parliament.

Career

As a costume designer, Carr was associated with the Aesthetic dress movement and its championship of looser, more flowing garments with theatrical touches such as lace and embroidery. It was rumored that she was the inspiration behind the comic figure of "Mrs Cimabue Brown" that the cartoonist George du Maurier invented to mock the Aestheticists in some of his drawings for Punch magazine.

For two decades, Carr was actor Ellen Terry's chief costume designer, succeeding Patience Harris. Carr began consulting with Terry and Harris in 1882, but the two designers' tastes didn't align well, and Harris resigned in 1887 following disagreements over costumes for the plays Henry VIII and The Amber Heart. The latter became the first production on which Carr had primary responsibility for Terry's costumes, though her influence is clear in designs as early as the 1885 production of Faust. Carr and Terry continued working together until 1902, when Terry left the Lyceum Theatre.

One of Carr's best-known works is a costume that used beetle wings to create an iridescent effect. 

The dress was worn by Terry as Lady Macbeth in the Shakespeare play Macbeth. It was designed by Carr and crocheted by dressmaker Ada Nettleship to simulate a soft chain mail with also something of an effect of serpent scales. Nettleship had used beetle wings in some of her earlier designs, and this dress employed over 1,000 beetle wings. The restored costume is now on display in Terry's home, Smallhythe Place, near Tenterden in Kent. The American artist John Singer Sargent painted Terry in the dress in 1889. Sargent was a friend of Carr and painted her portrait around the same time.

Carr later collaborated with Nettleship to make another dress for Terry, this time for a production of Henry VIII. In 1895, she collaborated with the artist Edward Burne-Jones on costumes for a production of the play King Arthur starring Henry Irving.

Carr wrote an analysis of fashion in 1850 for The Woman's World magazine after Oscar Wilde took over the editorship. Carr published a volume of reminiscences in 1926. In it, she wrote, "I had long been accustomed to supporting a certain amount of ridicule in the matter of clothes, because in the days when bustles and skin-tight dresses were the fashion, and a twenty-inch waist the aim of every self-respecting woman, my frocks followed the simple, straight line as waistless as those of today."

Carr also wrote several books, including "North Italian Folk: Sketches of Town and Country Life" (1878), "Margaret Maliphant" (1889), and "The Arm of the Lord" (1899).

References

1850 births
1927 deaths
British costume designers
19th-century British women writers
19th-century British writers